The Doctor Takes a Wife is a 1940 screwball comedy film starring Loretta Young and Ray Milland as a best-selling author and medical school instructor, respectively, who find it convenient to pretend to be married, even though they initially loathe each other.

Cast
 Loretta Young as June Cameron
 Ray Milland as Dr. Timothy Sterling
 Reginald Gardiner as John R. Pierce
 Gail Patrick as Marilyn Thomas
 Edmund Gwenn as Dr. Lionel Sterling
 Frank Sully as Louie Slapcovitch
 Gordon Jones as O'Brien
 Georges Metaxa as Jean Rovere
 Charles Halton as Dr. Streeter
 Joseph Eggenton as Dr. Nielson
 Paul McAllister as Dean Lawton
 Chester Clute as Johnson
 Hal K. Dawson as Charlie
 Edward Van Sloan as Burkhardt
 Virginia Sale as a school teacher (uncredited)

External links
 
 
 

American romantic comedy films
American screwball comedy films
American black-and-white films
Columbia Pictures films
Films directed by Alexander Hall
1940 romantic comedy films
1940 films
Films produced by William Perlberg
1940s American films